Montgomery is a city located in Montgomery County, Texas. As of the 2020 census, the city had a total population of 1,948.

History

The town of Montgomery was founded in the middle of the Lake Creek Settlement by W. W. Shepperd in July 1837 on 200 acres of land that had originally been part of the John Corner League. Shepperd had established the first store in the Lake Creek Settlement in 1835. W. W. Shepperd and his partner John Wyatt Moody named the town Montgomery.

Montgomery became the first county seat of Montgomery County shortly after the county was created on December 14, 1837.  Montgomery County was the third county formed during the Republic of Texas. The county originally extended from the Brazos River to the Trinity. The city was officially incorporated in 1848 with Judge Nathaniel Hart Davis as mayor.

Origins of the city's name
Local histories and accounts by 20th century historians held that the city and county of Montgomery were named after a family of early settlers to the area: Andrew Montgomery or Owen and Margaret Montgomery Shannon. However, recent evidence provided by Kameron Searle suggests that it is more likely that the town and county were named after Lemuel P. Montgomery, a major in the U.S. Army during the Creek War. John Wyatt Moody, one of the founders of Montgomery, was County Clerk of Montgomery County, Alabama before moving to Texas. Montgomery County, Alabama, is named for Lemuel P. Montgomery. Sam Houston, the President of the Republic of Texas when the town and county of Montgomery were founded, served in the Battle of Horseshoe Bend with Lemuel P. Montgomery, and witnessed his death in the front lines of the battle.  According to Searle, Moody and his partner W.W. Shepperd may have used Houston's connection with Lemuel Montgomery to help promote the creation of Montgomery County, with the town of Montgomery as the county seat.

Birthplace of the Lone Star Flag?
On July 7, 1922, Edmund B. Stewart, son of the early Montgomery settler Charles B. Stewart, claimed in a letter that his father had drafted the original design of the Lone Star Flag, enclosing what he claimed was his father's draft of the flag's design. To date, this letter and draft copy, along with claims by Stewart's descendants, remain the only evidence currently known that Charles Stewart was the designer of the flag. In particular, the lack of evidence not directly tied to the Stewart family has caused many flag historians to question Stewart's claim. As a legacy of the Stewart claim, the city of Montgomery describes itself as the "birthplace of the Texas Lone Star Flag."

Geography

Montgomery is located at 30°23'22" North, 95°41'53" West (30.389406, –95.698089).

The total area is 1.31% water.

Demographics

As of the 2020 United States census, there were 1,948 people, 833 households, and 596 families residing in the city.

In the 2010 United States Census, there were 621 people, 237 households, and 167 families residing in the city. The racial makeup of the city was 67.1% White, 26.4% African American, 0.6% Native American, 0.6% Asian, 0.00% Pacific Islander, 5.0% from other races, and 0.2% from two or more races. 14.5% of the population were Hispanic or Latino of any race.

There were 237 households, out of which 32.1% had children under the age of 18 living with them, 46.4% were married couples living together, 14.3% had a female householder with no husband present, and 29.5% were non-families. 25.3% of all households were made up of individuals. The average household size was 2.62 and the average family size was 3.13.

In the city, the population was spread out, with 26.7% under the age of 18, 7.9% from 18 to 24, 24.6% from 25 to 44, 27.5% from 45 to 64, and 13.0% who were 65 years of age or older. The median age was 38.6 years. For every 100 females, there were 95.3 males. For every 100 females age 18 and over, there were 95.7 males.

As of the 2015 American Community Survey, The median income for a household in the city was $48,125, and the median income for a family was $63,750. Males had a median income of $41,429 versus $24,000 for females. The per capita income for the city was $27,376. 20.3% of the population and 16.7% of families were below the poverty line. Out of the total population, 28.6% of those under the age of 18 and 9.1% of those 65 and older were living below the poverty line.

Government and infrastructure

The City of Montgomery is governed locally by a city council consisting of a mayor and 5 council members.

In the Texas Senate, Montgomery is part of District 3 and District 4, represented by Republicans Robert Nichols and Brandon Creighton. In the Texas House of Representatives, Montgomery is part of District 3 and District 16, represented by Republicans Cecil Bell Jr. and Will Metcalf.

In the United States Senate, Republicans John Cornyn and Ted Cruz represent the entire state. In the United States House of Representatives, Montgomery is part of District 8, represented by Republican Kevin Brady.

The United States Postal Service operates the Montgomery Post Office at 821H Eva Street (Texas State Highway 105) and the Montgomery Post Office Annex at 21359 Eva Street.

Education

Montgomery is a part of the Montgomery Independent School District.

Montgomery ISD is currently changing the structure of their feeder system. Previously, students attended a K–4 elementary, a 5th grade intermediate school, a 6th grade middle school, a 7–8th grade junior high school, and a 9–12th grade high school.

Beginning in the 2017–2018 school year, students will instead attend a K–5th grade elementary, 6–8th grade junior high, and 9th–12th grade high school.

For students located within Montgomery city limits:
K–5 students will attend Montgomery Elementary.
6–8 students will attend Montgomery Junior High.
9–12 students will attend Montgomery High School and Lake Creek High School.

Montgomery County Memorial Library System operates the Charles B. Stewart West Branch at 202 Bessie Price Owen Drive.

The Texas Legislature designated Montgomery ISD (and therefore the City of Montgomery) as part of Lone Star College (formerly the North Harris Montgomery Community College District).

Places

Fernland Historical Park

In 2012, the city established Fernland Historical Park to serve as a permanent location for some of the oldest remaining buildings and artifacts in Texas. A non-profit group, Fernland, Inc., and Sam Houston State University assisted the city in restoring and relocating the buildings to the park.

Historical Markers

The city of Montgomery contains buildings and other sites which date back to the original settlement of the area, such as Old Montgomery Cemetery, which contains the grave sites of some of Montgomery's first settlers. Historic buildings include the Davis Cottage and Museum, First State Bank, the Old Montgomery Baptist Church, and the Shelton-Smith House. Each site is designated with a historical marker established by the Texas Historical Commission. Texas Historical Commission markers inside the city limits include the most recent marker for the Lake Creek Settlement located in front of the Nat Hart Davis Cottage.

Westland Bunker

Ling-Chieh "Louis" Kung, the nephew of Soong Mei-ling, built an underground bunker in Montgomery, which was completed in 1982. Kung took money that he made from the success of the Westland Oil Development Corp. in the 1970s and used it to build the bunker, since he feared that the Soviet Union or the People's Republic of China would launch nuclear weapons towards the United States. Kung bought hundreds of acres of cow pasture on the outskirts of Montgomery and secretly began building the bunker. The two story,  bunker could house at least 700 people; Kung intended to have the bunker house his employees, their families, and others in case of a two-month emergency. Melanie Trottmann of The Wall Street Journal stated that the bunker "was a source of intrigue and gossip for the town of Montgomery." After the oil bust in the 1980s, Kung lost the title to the property; Kung died in 1996. Trottman said that the bunker "sat frozen in time" until a group of investors bought the property. The facility, now called "Westland Bunker," serves as a data storage center for businesses. The facility also contains office space that corporations can use in the event of a disaster.

Notable people

 Norm Branch, major league baseball pitcher. In retirement, he served as a mail carrier in the Montgomery area
 Kambri Crews, producer and publicist located in New York City, and author of Burn Down the Ground: A Memoir in which Montgomery is prominently featured
 Bailie Key, artistic gymnast
 Charles B. Stewart, physician and statesman. Stewart was Secretary to the Executive of the Consultation, a provisional government established during the Texas Revolution. He served as a delegate at the Convention of 1836, signing the Texas Declaration of Independence. He also represented Montgomery County at the Convention of 1845, which drafted the Texas State Constitution, and served as Montgomery County's first representative in the Texas State Legislature*

Climate
The climate in this area is characterized by hot, humid summers and generally mild to cool winters.  According to the Köppen Climate Classification system, Montgomery has a humid subtropical climate, abbreviated "Cfa" on climate maps.

References

External links

 City of Montgomery
 History of the Lake Creek Settlement and the Founding of the Town of Montgomery, Texas

Cities in Texas
Cities in Montgomery County, Texas
Greater Houston
Populated places established in 1837
1837 establishments in the Republic of Texas